Joe Brier (born 16 March 1999) is a Welsh track and field sprinter who specialises in the 400 metres. He has won medals with the British 4 × 400 metres relay team, including bronze at the World Athletics U20 Championships in 2018, silver at the 2019 European Athletics U23 Championships and bronze at the 2021 European Athletics Indoor Championships.

At national level, Brier won his first Welsh title in the 400 m in 2016. He placed fourth at the 2019 British Indoor Athletics Championships in his first British final. The following year he had his first national podium finish with second at the 2020 British Indoors.

His sister, Hannah Brier, is also a British sprint athlete.

International competitions

National titles
Welsh Athletics Championships
400 m: 2016

See also
List of European Athletics Indoor Championships medalists (men)

References

External links

1999 births
Living people
British male sprinters
Welsh male sprinters
Alumni of Cardiff Metropolitan University
Athletes (track and field) at the 2020 Summer Olympics
Olympic athletes of Great Britain
European Athletics Championships winners